Louis Armand de Bourbon (30 April 1661 – 9 November 1685) was Prince of Conti from 1666 to his death, succeeding his father, Armand de Bourbon. His mother was Anne Marie Martinozzi, the daughter of Girolamo Martinozzi and Laura Margherita Mazzarini, elder sister of Cardinal Mazarin. As a member of the reigning House of Bourbon, he was a Prince du Sang. He was a son-in-law of King Louis XIV of France, who was his namesake.

Biography

Louis Armand was born at the Hôtel de Conti (quai Malaquais) in Paris, France.

In August 1679 he acted as the groom in the proxy marriage where Marie Louise d'Orléans married Charles II of Spain. In 1680 he married Marie Anne de Bourbon, the illegitimate daughter of King Louis XIV and his first mistress, Louise de La Vallière. The bride and groom were respectively thirteen and eighteen years old at the time. Since neither of them had been instructed on what to expect on their first night together, it ended up in disaster, with Marie Anne fleeing in despair and the prince not wanting to share the bed of a woman again.

He served with distinction in Flanders in 1683, and, against the wish of the King, went to Hungary, where he helped the Imperialists defeat the Turks at Gran in the same year. He died at the Palace of Fontainebleau from smallpox, which he contracted from his wife. While she recovered after some time, the Prince succumbed after five days.

Having no descendants, he was succeeded as Prince of Conti by his younger brother, François Louis de Bourbon (1664–1709).

Ancestry

References

1661 births
1685 deaths
Nobility from Paris
Louis Armand 1
Louis Armand
Deaths from smallpox
Infectious disease deaths in France
17th-century peers of France